Arhopala aedias, the large metallic oakblue, is a species of butterfly belonging to the lycaenid family described by William Chapman Hewitson in 1862. It is found in Southeast Asia (Burma, Thailand, Peninsular Malaya, Sumatra, Bangka, Nias, Borneo and the Philippines).

Subspecies
Arhopala aedias aedias (Java)
Arhopala aedias yendava (Grose-Smith, 1887) (Burma: Karen Hills, Yendaw Valley, Ataran)
Arhopala aedias meritatas Corbet, 1941 (Mergui, southern Burma, Langkawi)
Arhopala aedias agnis C. & R. Felder, [1865] (Thailand, Peninsular Malaysia, Sumatra, Bangka, Nias, Borneo)
Arhopala aedias oenotria (Hewitson, 1869) (Mindanao)

References

External links
"Arhopala Boisduval, 1832" at Markku Savela's Lepidoptera and Some Other Life Forms. Retrieved June 7, 2017.

Arhopala
Butterflies described in 1862
Taxa named by William Chapman Hewitson
Butterflies of Asia